Chang Qu (c. 291 – c. 361 CE) was a 4th-century Chinese historian of the Cheng Han dynasty, who wrote the Chronicles of Huayang or Records of the States South of Mount Hua, the oldest extant regional history of China.

References
 https://web.archive.org/web/20060208022651/http://www1.chengdu.gov.cn/echengdu/overview/cultural.jsp

Sixteen Kingdoms historians
4th-century Chinese historians
290s births
360s deaths
Year of birth uncertain
Year of death uncertain
Writers from Chengdu
4th-century Chinese people
Cheng Han people
Historians from Sichuan
Chinese local historians